"Low" is a song by American singer-songwriter Kelly Clarkson from her debut album, Thankful (2003). The song was written by Jimmy Harry and produced by Clif Magness. It was released as the album's second official single, on August 3, 2003, while it was also released as a double A-side single with "The Trouble with Love Is" in the United Kingdom. This release reached only number 35, but "Low" was more successful in Australia and Canada, reaching numbers 11 and two, respectively, while also peaking at number 58 in the United States. The song received favorable reviews from music critics who complimented her vocals and the song's lyrics. On March 5, 2013, Billboard ranked the song at number 90 in its list of "Top 100 American Idol Hits of All Time".

Background and release 
After some encouragement from friends, Jimmy Harry, the songwriter of "Low", asked singer-songwriter Danielle Brisebois to sing the demo and offered it to Britney and Kylie, but "it really wasn’t a good fit for what they were doing," said the songwriter. The song eventually found its way to Kelly, which initially filled Jimmy with apprehension. "I was a bit conflicted about Kelly doing the song," he admits. "Mostly because it seemed like they were going for a Celine Dion/Mariah Carey sort of vibe with her and I wasn’t sure how it was going to make sense with what I had heard from the rest of the record. I liked the version she cut a lot. I was expecting it to be a bit more pop than the way Clif Magness produced it."

After reaching number 9 on the Billboard Hot 100 chart with "Miss Independent", Clarkson wasn't immediately convinced that "Low" should be a single. Other contenders, and possible third singles, were "Just Missed the Train," "The Trouble with Love Is" and "You Thought Wrong," a duet with Tamyra Gray. Eventually, "Low" was released as the second single on August 3, 2003, and in the United Kingdom, the song was released as a double A-side single with "The Trouble With Love Is". Jimmy Harry was surprised when the song was chosen to be a single, "I think it was a big leap of faith to segue from ‘Miss Independent’ to ‘Low’ because the production and lyrical content were so different,' he continues. I was really surprised when I learned it was going to be the second single. I knew it was a great song. I’m happy it saw the light of day."

Composition and lyrics 
"Low" was written by Jimmy Harry and produced by Cliff Magness, who also arranged and engineered the track. The midtempo country-flavored track finds the singer reflecting on a broken relationship. "It's cool you didn't want me/ Sometimes you can't go back/ But why'd you have to go and make a mess like that?" she sings before asking in the chorus: "Have you ever been low? Have you ever had a friend that let you down so?". Harry has said that "Low" "was a really personal song for me. I wrote it and wasn’t quite sure what to do with it because it was a pretty brutal lyric and I felt it wasn’t something a lot of pop artists would want to do."

Critical reception 
Henry Goldblatt of Entertainment Weekly praised the vocal performance and wrote that Kelly owns country-ish "Low." Arion Berger of Rolling Stone wrote that "the album's producers jam Clarkson into the stilettos of MTV sexpots like Faith Hill in 'Low'."" Slant Magazine's editor Sal Cinquemani called it an "adult-skewed power ballad" "overwrought". Elysa Gardner of USA Today editor Elysa Gardner praised "Clarkson's singing", writing that it "can take on a sensual raspiness more evocative of blues-influenced rock artists, so that wistful but driving numbers such as 'Low' and 'Just Missed the Train' sound more authoritative than you might expect." Sputnikmusic praised "Miss Independent" and "Low", calling them "both huge singles that drove the album towards that platinum mark rather quickly." Mike Wass of Idolator praised the "surprisingly gritty" song, "which introduced the songstress to a sound she would explore more fully on the criminally underrated My December."

Chart performance
After the success of the previous singles, "A Moment Like This" and "Miss Independent", "Low" wasn't as successful as the last two singles. In the United States, "Low" was a mediocre hit, peaking at number 58 on the Billboard Hot 100 chart. It also appeared on several airplay charts, including the Top 40 Tracks ranking, and peaked at number 14 on the Top 40 Mainstream chart. In the United Kingdom, "Low" was released as a double A-side single with "The Trouble with Love Is", where it peaked at number 35.
 
The song proved to be more successful in Australia, debuting and peaking at number 11, on November 9, 2003, and receiving a gold certification in 2004. In Canada, after debuting at number 58 on the Canadian Singles Chart, the song climbed up the listing. Eight weeks later, "Low" entered the top 10, and 11 weeks following its debut, the song reached the number-two position. On March 5, 2013, Billboard ranked the song at number 90 on its list of "Top 100 American Idol Hits of All Time".

Music video
The accompanying music video was directed by Antti Jokinen, who also directed Clarkson's "A Moment Like This" and "Before Your Love" videos. Jokinen explained that he wanted Clarkson "to rock and kick ass a little bit more than she normally does." He also added that, "I listened to the lyrics and there were elements of lost love and feeling low, and there are some scenes directly from that, however they are portrayed in more metaphoric terms." About the video' storyline, J. said, "I had 'Thelma & Louise' in mind, but I don't think we wanted her to drive over the cliff." "I already thought it was kind of risky, because it shows such a different attitude than she normally portrays. She pulled it off and it was more about fun. It's more tongue-in-cheek than it is a serious, like, 'You messed me over and now I'm going to drive your car off a cliff.'"

Storyline 
The video opens with Clarkson cruising on a desert highway in a Land Rover Series II that viewers later learn belongs to an old flame. While driving, she envisions the guy driving by and holding up his number on a piece of paper, but she sings, "No, I don't need your number." Eventually, after cutting back from footage of her performing at a drive-in theater (with psychedelic imagery on the big screen), the video shows Clarkson pulling off the road near the edge of a cliff. Then, she stops with the front wheels just over the edge. She gets out, emotionless, and walks away, but not before kicking the bumper and sending the vehicle tumbling.

Track listings
Canadian CD single
 "Low" (radio edit) – 3:29
 "Miss Independent" (MaUVe full vocal mix) – 7:55

UK enhanced CD single: "Low"/"The Trouble with Love Is"
 "Low"
 "The Trouble with Love Is" – 3:42
 "Respect"
 "Low" (music video) – 3:28

Australian CD single
 "Low" (album version) – 3:29
 "Miss Independent" (Shanghai Surprise club mix) – 7:33
 "Miss Independent" (MaUVe mix) – 7:55
 "Miss Independent" (Junior Vasquez Tribal) – 9:23

Charts

Certifications

Release history

References

2000s ballads
2003 singles
Kelly Clarkson songs
RCA Records singles
Songs about heartache
Songs written by Jimmy Harry